Tri Brata Rafflesia Football Club (formerly known as Polda Bengkulu FC) is an Indonesian football club based in Bengkulu (city), Bengkulu. They currently compete in the Liga 3.

Honours
 Liga 3 Bengkulu
 Runner-up: 2021

References

External links
 Tribrata Rafflesia Instagram
 Tribrata Rafflesia Facebook

Bengkulu (city)
Football clubs in Indonesia
 Football clubs in Bengkulu
Association football clubs established in 2012
2012 establishments in Indonesia